Mount Terrazas is a prominent ridgelike mountain 10 nautical miles (18 km) west of Mount Austin in Palmer Land. Mapped by United States Geological Survey (USGS) from surveys and U.S. Navy air photos, 1961–67. Named by Advisory Committee on Antarctic Names (US-ACAN) for Rudolph D. Terrazas, builder at South Pole Station in 1967.

Mountains of Palmer Land